Erik Tony Emanuel Andersson (born September 10, 1984) is a butterfly, freestyle and medley swimmer from Sweden currently representing Linköpings ASS. He started his career in Trollhättans SS, but moved to Linköping and Linköpings ASS to study at the Linköping University. Andersson participated in the 2004 Summer Olympics in Athens finishing 32nd on the 100 m butterfly. He also has bronze medal on 4x50 m freestyle relay from the European SC Championships 2004 in Wien together with David Nordenlilja, Marcus Piehl and Petter Stymne.

Personal bests

Long course (50 m)

Short course (25 m)

Clubs
Trollhättans SS (-2005, 2005–2006)
Göteborg Sim (2005)
Linköpings ASS (2006-)

References

1984 births
Living people
Swedish male butterfly swimmers
Swedish male freestyle swimmers
Swedish male medley swimmers
Swimmers at the 2004 Summer Olympics
Olympic swimmers of Sweden
Linköping University alumni
Trollhättans SS swimmers
Göteborg Sim swimmers
Linköpings ASS swimmers